The 1984–85 Yugoslav First Basketball League season was the 41st season of the Yugoslav First Basketball League, the highest professional basketball league in SFR Yugoslavia.

Regular season

Classification

Playoff 
Only the top four placed league table teams qualified for the playoffs quarterfinal automatically.

Teams placed fifth, sixth, seventh, eighth, ninth, and tenth were joined by the top two Second League teams for an 8-team play-in round. The winner of each best-of-three series advanced to the playoffs quarterfinal round.

The winning roster of Cibona:
  Dražen Petrović
  Mihovil Nakić
  Aleksandar Petrović
  
  Andro Knego
  Sven Ušić
  Zoran Čutura
  Franjo Arapović
  Ivo Nakić
  Branko Vukićević
  Igor Lukačić

Coach:  Željko Pavličević

Scoring leaders
 Dražen Petrović (Cibona) – ___ points (32.0ppg)

Qualification in 1985–86 season European competitions 

FIBA European Champions Cup
 Cibona (champions)

FIBA Cup Winners' Cup
 Jugoplastika (Cup finalist)

FIBA Korać Cup
 Crvena Zvezda (2nd)
 Zadar (3rd)
 Bosna (4th)
 Partizan (5th)

References

Yugoslav First Basketball League seasons
 
Yugoslav